Daan Paau (born 11 November 1985 in Heumen) is a footballer who plays as a midfielder for SV AWC.

He is a youth product from local side SV Heumen and Vitesse Arnhem, but didn't succeed at the latter due to an injury. Paau formerly played first team football for SV Heumen Achilles '29.

References

External links
 Voetbal International profile 

1985 births
Living people
Dutch footballers
Association football midfielders
Eerste Divisie players
Derde Divisie players
Achilles '29 players
People from Heumen
Footballers from Gelderland